The 1940 Kansas State Wildcats football team represented Kansas State University in the 1940 college football season. The team's head football coach was Hobbs Adams, in his first year of his first tenure at the helm of the Wildcats. The Wildcats played their home games in Memorial Stadium. The Wildcats finished the season with a 2–7 record with a 1–4 record in conference play. They finished in fifth place in the Big Six Conference.  The Wildcats scored 73 points and gave up 145 points.

Schedule

References

Kansas State
Kansas State Wildcats football seasons
Kansas State Wildcats football